Gabriela Scherer (born 1981 in Zurich, Switzerland) is a Swiss mezzo-soprano.

Birth and education 
Gabriela Scherer was born in 1981 in Zurich, Switzerland. She grew up in Switzerland where she was exposed to music at an early age. Having spent many years singing and learning music with the local choir she began her studies with Helen Keller (Smpv) in Zurich.

Between 2002 and 2006, Gabriela continued her studies at the University of Mozarteum Salzburg with Prof. Horiana Branisteanu and Prof. KS Elizabeth Wilke. She attended courses from Prof. Claudia Eder and Denia Mazzola-Gavazzeni (Milan).

Career 
During the year, the young mezzo-soprano worked as well with Prof. Irina Gavrilovici in Vienna and still works with Bernhard Gärtner in (Stuttgart). In addition intense co-operation with the Salzburger chamber soloists allowed her to take part in numerous concerts in Austria, Germany and Switzerland. As part of her studies she had already sung in opera productions of "Hoffmanns Erzählungen" from Jacques Offenbach, Engelbert Humperdinck "Hänsel und Gretel", "Momo" by Mark Lothar and Mozart's "Le nozze di Figaro". Furthermore, apart from her commitment to being a young mezzo-soprano, Gabriela applies herself to opera particularly the mass and oratories of Bach, Handel, Mozart and Haydn.

At the beginning of 2005 she sang, in Switzerland, under the direction of Urs Stäuble and with the Württembergische Philharmonic Orchestra, in Le Laudi of Hermann Suter.

Since September 2006, she has been a member at the international Opernstudio in Zurich.

Further roles of their repertoire are: Orpheus from Gluck's "Orfeo ed Euridice", Olga from Tschaikovsky's "Eugene Onegin", Charlotte from Massenet's "Werther", Sesto and Cornelia from Handel's "Julius Caesar", Orlofsky from the "Die Fledermaus" of Johann Strauß and particularly the mezzoparts from the operas of Mozart (Cherubino, Ramiro, Annio, Zerlina, Sesto, Dorabella, Farnace).

Awards 
In 2005, the young singer won the international singing competition Kammeroper Schloss Rheinsberg for the role of “Hänsel” and was presented a prize by Vera and Volker Doppelfeld. For the remaining year, the young singer also played the role of the "HΣnsel" at the theatres Brandenburg, Potsdam and Frankfurt an der Oder. She was laureate of the 9th International Mozart Competition 2006 in Salzburg.
She is as well laureate of the "Armin-Weltner-Foundation" and the foundation "Lyra" of the Vontobel Bank.

References

External links 
 Gabriela Scherer; Oper Leipzig

1981 births
Living people
Operatic mezzo-sopranos
Musicians from Zürich
Swiss sopranos
21st-century Swiss women opera singers